The British men's rugby league champions are the winners of the highest league in British rugby league, which since 1996 is the Super League.

History

Following the schism in 1895 that saw 22 Northern rugby clubs split from the Rugby Football Union and form the Northern Union, the 22 clubs were organised into one league. At the end of the 1895–96 season, Manningham were the first club to be crowned champions, finishing one point ahead of Halifax.

Following the success of the Northern Unions first season, more clubs defected from the Rugby Football Union to join the new league. After concerns around travel and costs were expressed, the decision was made that the competition should be split into two separate county championships: Lancashire and Yorkshire Leagues. County leagues were in place for the next five seasons until 1901–02 were the top seven sides from each league resigned to merge to form a new league. The only other times that there was no major championship was when there were outbrakes of war.

During the late 1980s and early 90s, Wigan became the only full-time professional club and dominated in every competition. A new Super League began to be mooted during the Super League war in Australia as a way for Rupert Murdoch to gain an upper hand in broadcasting supremacy with the Australian Rugby League. British clubs were approached to form a Super League with a cash incentive. Part of the deal was switching the sport to summer and the merger of some clubs, the latter not taking place due to huge protest from fans. All four Super League champions; St Helens, Wigan, Bradford and Leeds have all previously won the old First Division.

Only three clubs to have been crowned champions are not in existence today. During the reclassification of the Championship in 1901, the league was split into two divisions. Manningham were placed in the Second Division, finishing 10th out of 18 teams. At the end of the season a series of meetings was held about establishing a Football League club in the city. During an annual meeting the committee voted to switch to association football, becoming Bradford City. A similar situation occurred at Bradford FC in 1907 when a narrow majority of members voted to withdraw from the Northern Union in favour of association football, forming Bradford Park Avenue. Broughton Rangers struggled post war and folded in 1955 after a failed name change to Belle Vue Rangers in 1946.

Hunslet FC were the fourth former champions to fold after financial issues , player strikes and a stadium fire that led to the club selling the land to developers before being eventually wound up. Unlike the other three clubs which no longer exist, a phoenix club, New Hunslet, was formed in 1973 and still exists.

Method of determining champion 

The method of determining the champions has changed multiple times between using the first past the post method of crowning league leaders champions or a play off series. A play off series was first used in 1906, this was due to some clubs playing more games than others and league positions being decided by win percentages rather than competition points.

Most seasons have been decided by a play off format. Between 1973 and 1997 was the longest era where a first place league finish was used to decide the champions.

List of Champions

RFL Championship First Division (1895–1996)

Super League (1996–present)

Total titles won
There are 23 clubs who have won the British tile, including 4 who have won the Super League (1996–present). The most recent to join the list were Featherstone Rovers in 1977–78.

Four clubs have finished runners up without ever winning a Championship: Castleford Tigers (1938–39, 1968–69, 2017), London Broncos (1997), Catalans Dragons (2021) and the now defunct St Helens Recs (1926–27).

 § Denotes club now defunct

League Leaders
During the eras of the top flight when the Championship is decided by a playoff the teams finishing top of the league are the League Leaders. Since 2003 clubs have been awarded the League Leaders Shield. Only three clubs; Castleford, St Helen's Recs and Catalans have been League Leaders and never won a Championship.

 § Denotes club now defunct

Title droughts

The longest gap between titles was Leigh who waited 76 years between 1906 and 1982.

The longest wait for a first title was by Featherstone Rovers was waited 76 years between their first season in 1921 and their title winning season in 1977.

See also
Super League
Rugby Football League Championship First Division
Super League Grand Final
Rugby Football League Championship Final
League Leaders Shield
Australian rugby league premiers

References

British rugby league lists